Pedro Juan Mejía Eusebio (born June 29, 1978) is a Dominican sprinter, who specialized in the 400 metres. He won two bronze medals, as a member of the Dominican Republic national team, in the men's 4 × 400 m relay at the 2007 Pan American Games in Rio de Janeiro, Brazil, and at the 2008 IAAF World Indoor Championships in Valencia, Spain.

Mejia competed for the men's 4 × 400 m relay at the 2008 Summer Olympics in Beijing, along with his teammates Yoel Tapia, Carlos Yohelin Santa, and Arismendy Peguero. He ran on the third leg of the second heat, with an individual-split time of 46.31 seconds. Mejia and his team finished the relay in last place for a seasonal best time of 3:04.31, failing to advance into the final.

References

External links
NBC 2008 Olympics profile

1978 births
Living people
Dominican Republic male sprinters
Olympic athletes of the Dominican Republic
Athletes (track and field) at the 2008 Summer Olympics
Pan American Games bronze medalists for the Dominican Republic
Pan American Games medalists in athletics (track and field)
Athletes (track and field) at the 2007 Pan American Games
World Athletics Indoor Championships medalists
Medalists at the 2007 Pan American Games